The 12' Dinghy International Rule was an event on the 2018 Vintage Yachting Games program at Copenhagen, Denmark. Six out of the eight scheduled races were completed. 22 sailors, on 19 boats, from nine nations entered.

Venue overview

Race area and course
Both of the course areas on the Øresund in front of Hellerup were available for the 12' Dinghy event. On the first two days, course Alpha was used. The next day the class moved to course Bravo for less wind and waves.

Wind conditions 
The Øresund in front of the Hellerup Sejlklub was during the 2018 Vintage Yachting Games one of the targets of the remains of the Hurricane Florence. This resulted in South-Westerly winds that varied between 12–38 knots over the period of the Vintage.
Course area Alpha was more in the open sea. With the South-Westerly winds this meant more wind and more waves. Also the wind was more stable and predictable then closer to shore.

Races

Summary 
In the 12' Dinghy six out of the planned eight races were completed.

The  12' Dinghy class (Olympic in 1920, 1928 and candidate for the 1940 Tokyo Olympics) brought large fleet from nine countries to the Vintage. This was due to the driving force of the class admiral Bert Hamminga. The races were dominated by Wim Bleeker. The big fight was for the other podium places.
When there is a lot of wind it is customary that sailors that are not able to handle the conditions start crewing for sailors that are higher ranked. Due to this elegant principle no sailors need to stay ashore on windy days. This shows on the many DNC results.

Results 

 dnc = did not compete
 dnf = did not finish
 bdf = Black flagged
 Crossed out results did not count for the total result.

Daily standings

Victors

Notes
Information about the Vintage Yachting Classes (former Olympic classes) can be verified by:
 IOC
 World Sailing
 Nederlands Scheepvaartmuseum Amsterdam
 Vintage Yachting Games Organization

Information about the organization, conditions, sailors and results can be verified by:
 Manage 2 Sail
 Twaalf Voets Jollen Club
 Admiralty 12' Dinghy (International Rule)
 International Olympiajol Union
 International Soling Association

References

2018 Vintage Yachting Games